The 2020–21 Svenska Cupen was the 65th season of the Svenska Cupen and the ninth season with the current format. Hammarby won the cup for the first time and secured a spot in the second qualifying round of the 2021–22 UEFA Europa Conference League. A total of 96 clubs entered the competition, 64 teams from district sites and 32 from the Allsvenskan and the Superettan.

Round and draw dates
The schedule of the competition was as follows:

Teams

Round 1

First round matches were played between 30 July and 16 September. 64 clubs from the third tier or lower of the Swedish league system competed in this round.

Round 2
64 teams will compete in this round: 32 winners from Round 1 and the 32 teams from the 2020 Allsvenskan and 2020 Superettan. All games will be played on 30 September–1 October 2020.

Seeding

Matches

Group stage
The 32 winners from round 2 will be divided into eight groups of four teams. The 16 highest ranked winners from the previous rounds will be seeded to the top two positions in each group and the 16 remaining winners will be unseeded in the draw. The ranking of the 16 seeded teams will be decided by league position in the 2020 season. All teams in the group stage will play each other once, the highest-ranked teams from the previous rounds and teams from tier three or lower will have the right to play two home matches.

Qualified teams

Seeded
 AIK (1)
BK Häcken (1)
 Djurgårdens IF (1)
Falkenbergs FF (1)
 Hammarby IF (1)
Helsingborgs IF (1)
IF Elfsborg (1)
IFK Göteborg (1)
IK Sirius (1)
IFK Norrköping (1)
Kalmar FF (1)
Malmö FF (1)
Mjällby AIF (1)
Örebro SK (1)
Östersunds FK (1)
Halmstads BK (2)

Unseeded
AFC Eskilstuna (2)
Akropolis IF (2)
Dalkurd FF (2)
Degerfors IF (2)
GAIS (2)
GIF Sundsvall (2)
IK Brage (2)
Trelleborgs FF (2)
Umeå FC (2)
Västerås SK (2)
Landskrona BoIS (3)
Oskarshamns AIK (3)
Sandvikens IF (3)
Utsiktens BK (3)
IK Gauthiod (4)
IF Lödde (5)

Group 1

Group 2

Group 3

Group 4

Group 5

Group 6

Group 7

Group 8

Knockout stage

Qualified teams

Bracket

Quarter-finals

Semi-finals

Final

References

Svenska Cupen seasons
Cupen
Cupen
Sweden